Öner Erkan (born 4 January 1980) is a Turkish actor.

Biography 
Öner Erkan was born on 4 January 1980 in İzmir, Turkey. He began acting at the age of 15 and graduated from Department of Theatre, Dokuz Eylül University. He received a master's degree in Bahçeşehir University. Between 2003 and 2004, he acted in various plays by İstanbul City Theatre.  

He had guest role in hit sitcom Avrupa Yakası. He played later in popular family comedy series İki Aile as Ferit Pamukçuoğlu. He played in hit sitcom Yalan Dünya as Bora Alsancak from 2012 to 2014. He played in crime series Çukur as Selim Koçovalı from 2017 to 2020 recently. 

He played in Netflix series "Uysallar", "Bir Başkadır".

He has also appeared in movies such as Organize İşler, Son Osmanlı Yandım Ali, Hırsız Var; and enacted leading roles in Kağıt and 7 Kocalı Hürmüz. In 2009, he won the Golden Orange prize for Best Leading Actor for his role in Bornova Bornova.

He also won the Afife Theater Awards for Best Actor Award for his roles in Babamın Cesetleri and Dünyada Karşılaşmış Gibi.

Filmography

TV series

Film

References

External links
 

1980 births
Best Actor Golden Orange Award winners
Living people
Actors from İzmir
Turkish male film actors
Turkish male stage actors
Turkish male television actors
Best Actor Golden Boll Award winners
Dokuz Eylül University alumni